Norrtälje is a locality and the seat of Norrtälje Municipality, Stockholm County, Sweden with 17,275 inhabitants in 2010. It is one of the largest towns in Roslagen.

History 

Norrtälje’s early history dates back to the Iron Age. Around 225 ancient monuments have been found within what is now the city. Three ancient castles are assumed to have stood in the former villages Nordrona, Solbacka and Knutby. Norrtälje traces its more recent history to 1219, when the location was first mentioned as Tälje. After some time, the name officially became Norrtälje, to distinguish it from the other Tälje in the province, Södertälje.

The town of Norra Tällie was founded by King Gustav II Adolf in 1622, as were several other towns after the outbreak of the Thirty Years' War, The city arms were created as an upside down anchor as early as 1622 when the charter was granted.

In 1719, large parts of the central town were burnt down by a Russian army during the Russian Pillage of 171921. The new stone church was not finished until 1726, and it was another four years before the city hall was completed.

Norrtälje had a railway station on the narrow gauge Roslagsbanan from 1884 to 1969. It is now served by SL buses as a part of the system of public transport in Stockholm.

Norrtälje has a first class industrial heritage displayed in the Pythagoras Mechanical Workshop Museum, based in the premises of a former hot bulb engine factory.

Climate 
Norrtälje has a humid continental climate with some maritime influence. Summers are highly variable and can be either very warm or quite subdued. The official station number assigned to Norrtälje was 8644 and there was an downtown weather station in operation until 1984.

The chart below is from Svanberga, a village close to Norrtälje. Its more inland location makes it a bit more prone to cold snaps than the town itself, although high temperatures are similar. Even so, Norrtälje remains quite a bit colder than Stockholm and coastal areas further south throughout the year and is more likely to have snow cover. The distance from the open sea to the urban area also affects the local climate, with less maritime moderation than in other coastal towns.

Gallery

Sports
The following sports clubs are located in Norrtälje:

 BKV Norrtälje
 Norrtälje IK
 HK Ceres
 Roslagens GK
 Norrtelje BK

Notable people
Eddie Läck, former NHL goaltender who is now a coaching assistant for the Arizona State Sun Devils hockey team

See also 

 Penningby Castle
 Stockholm archipelago
 Roslagen

References 

Populated places in Norrtälje Municipality
Municipal seats of Stockholm County
Swedish municipal seats
Great Northern War
Port cities and towns of the Baltic Sea
Coastal cities and towns in Sweden

io:Norrtälje
fi:Norrtäljen kunta